James FitzGibbon (16 November 1780 – 10 December 1863) was a British soldier in the War of 1812.

Early life and career
Born to Garrett (Gerald) FitzGibbon and Mary Widenham in Glin, County Limerick, Ireland, he enlisted in the Knight of Glin's Yeomanry Corps at age 15. Three years later, he joined the Tarbert Infantry Fencibles, an Irish home service regiment, from which he was recruited into the British Army's 49th Regiment of Foot as a private soldier.  He first fought in battle in 1799 at Egmond aan Zee, the Netherlands.  He later served as a marine in the Battle of Copenhagen, for which he received the Naval General Service Medal.

Arrival in Canada
He went to the Canadas in 1802, by which time he was a sergeant. He played a key role in the suppression of a near-mutiny at Fort George, Upper Canada. In 1806, when he was the regiment's sergeant-major, his commanding officer, Isaac Brock, made him an officer. This was extremely unusual at the time as most  officers' commissions were bought.  Later the same year he was appointed regimental adjutant. In 1809, he was promoted to the rank of lieutenant.

War of 1812

FitzGibbon fought at the Battle of Stoney Creek on 6 June 1813. Three weeks later, he led 50 soldiers in guerrilla-style raids on a large American force that had captured Fort George on the Niagara Peninsula. It was he who was warned by Laura Secord on 22 June about an impending surprise attack by 500 American troops. This led to the Battle of Beaver Dams near present-day Thorold, Ontario, where FitzGibbon's force, together with about 400 Mohawk and Odawa warriors, defeated the Americans and took 462 prisoners. The victory made FitzGibbon a popular hero and he was promoted to captain in the Glengarry Light Infantry Fencibles. In 1814 he fought at the Battle of Lundy's Lane.

Post-war activities

After the war, FitzGibbon retired on half-pay and became a clerk in the office of the Adjutant-General of the militia. He was later promoted to Assistant Adjutant-General.

In 1818, FitzGibbon responded to accusations from Robert Gourlay that the lieutenant-governor thought Canadians were disloyal and ungrateful British subjects. In 1824 the Lieutenant-Governor of Upper Canada Peregrine Maitland sent FitzGibbon to negotiate an end to riots in the Bathurst District of York between Irish settlers and previous residents. A year later newspapers in Upper Canada questioned the loyalty of Irish immigrants and FitzGibbon wrote editorials defending the immigrants.

In 1826, FitzGibbon initiated a campaign to help the defendants of the Types Riot pay their settlement to Mackenzie. He denied accusations by Francis Collins in the Canadian Freeman that Maitland contributed to the fund but did not deny his involvement or contributions from other government administrators.

During the Upper Canada Rebellion of 1837, FitzGibbon was appointed Acting Adjutant-General of Militia. He organised and led the forces that defended Toronto from William Lyon Mackenzie's rebel force.

Later life and legacy
He moved to England in 1847 after the death of his wife Mary Haley, with whom he had four sons and a daughter. In 1850 he was appointed a Military Knight of Windsor.

He died at Windsor Castle in 1863 and is buried there in the crypt of St. George's Chapel.

In 2003 his descendants donated some of his personal effects, including a signet ring and a ceremonial sword, to the Canadian War Museum in Ottawa.

In popular culture
FitzGibbon appears in The Bully Boys, a novel by Eric Walters. The book follows his interactions with fictional character Thomas Roberts, whom he takes under his wing during the events surrounding the Battle of Beaver Dams.

References

External links
 The Glengarry Light Infantry Fencibles
 Biography at the Dictionary of Canadian Biography Online
Historica’s Heritage Minute video docudrama about “Laura Secord.” (Adobe Flash Player.)

1780 births
1863 deaths
18th-century Irish people
19th-century Irish people
Military personnel from County Limerick
Upper Canada Rebellion people
British Army personnel of the French Revolutionary Wars
British Army personnel of the War of 1812
49th Regiment of Foot officers
Royal Berkshire Regiment soldiers
British colonial army officers
Irish officers in the British Army
Military Knights of Windsor
Pre-Confederation Ontario people
Canadian Militia officers
British people of the War of 1812
British military personnel of the War of 1812
Canadian people of the War of 1812